Skagit Peak is a  mountain summit located in the North Cascades, in Whatcom County of Washington state. It is situated on the western side of the Cascade crest, at the western edge of the Pasayten Wilderness, on land managed by the Okanogan–Wenatchee National Forest. Skagit Peak is part of the Hozameen Range, a subset of the North Cascades which also includes Hozomeen Mountain to the north, and Jack Mountain to the south. Precipitation runoff from this mountain drains into the Skagit River via Three Fools Creek and Ross Lake.

Geology 
The North Cascades features some of the most rugged topography in the Cascade Range with craggy peaks, granite spires, ridges, and deep glacial valleys. Geological events occurring many years ago created the diverse topography and drastic elevation changes over the Cascade Range leading to various climate differences.

The history of the formation of the Cascade Mountains dates back millions of years ago to the late Eocene Epoch. With the North American Plate overriding the Pacific Plate, episodes of volcanic igneous activity persisted. In addition, small fragments of the oceanic and continental lithosphere called terranes created the North Cascades about 50 million years ago.

During the Pleistocene period dating back over two million years ago, glaciation advancing and retreating repeatedly scoured the landscape leaving deposits of rock debris. The "U"-shaped cross section of the river valleys are a result of recent glaciation. Uplift and faulting in combination with glaciation have been the dominant processes which have created the tall peaks and deep valleys of the North Cascades area.

Climate
Skagit Peak is located in the marine west coast climate zone of western North America. Most weather fronts originate in the Pacific Ocean, and travel northeast toward the Cascade Mountains. As fronts approach the North Cascades, they are forced upward by the peaks of the Cascade Range, causing them to drop their moisture in the form of rain or snowfall onto the Cascades. As a result, the west side of the North Cascades experiences high precipitation, especially during the winter months in the form of snowfall. Due to its temperate climate and proximity to the Pacific Ocean, areas west of the Cascade Crest very rarely experience temperatures below  or above . During winter months, weather is usually cloudy, but, due to high pressure systems over the Pacific Ocean that intensify during summer months, there is often little or no cloud cover during the summer. Because of maritime influence, snow tends to be wet and heavy, resulting in high avalanche danger. The months July through September offer the most favorable weather for viewing or climbing this peak.

See also

 Geography of the North Cascades
 Geology of the Pacific Northwest
 Spratt Mountain

References

External links
 Weather forecast: Skagit Peak
 Skagit Peak, North Face aerial photo: PBase
 Skagit Peak, SE Face aerial photo: PBase

Mountains of Washington (state)
Mountains of Whatcom County, Washington
Cascade Range
North Cascades
North Cascades of Washington (state)
North American 2000 m summits